is a district of Shibuya, Tokyo, Japan.

As of October 2020, the population of this district is 12,446. The postal code for Jingūmae is 150–0001.

Places of interest

Cultural

Shrines
 Tōgō Shrine
 Aoyama Kumano Shrine (青山熊野神社) (Jingūmae 2-2-22)

Temples
 Myōenji (Jingūmae 3-8-9)
 Chōanji (Jingūmae 3-8-4)

Churches
 Tenrikyo Higashi Chuo Kyokai (Jingūmae 5-14-2)
 First Church of Christ, Scientist, Tokyo (Jingūmae 5-6-3)
 Tokyo Union Church (Jingūmae 5-7-7)

Museums
 Ukiyo-e Ōta Memorial Museum of Art
 Watari Museum of Contemporary Art
 Design Festa Gallery

Embassies
 Embassy of Turkey (Jingūmae 2-33-6)
 Embassy of Estonia (Jingūmae 2-6-15)

Other
 Harajuku Station
 Headquarters of Secom (Jingūmae 1-5-1)
 Takeshita Street
 Laforet Harajuku (Jingūmae 1-11-6)
 Harajuku Alta (Jingūmae 1-16-4)
 Omotesando Hills
 Tokyu Plaza Omotesando Harajuku (Jingūmae 4-30-4)
 YM Square Harajuku (Jingūmae 4-31)
 Headquarters of United Nations University (Jingūmae 5-53-70)
 Gyre (Jingūmae 5-10-1)
 Oriental Bazaar (Jingūmae 5-9-13)
 Miyashita Park

Education

Schools

 operates public elementary and junior high schools.

Jingūmae 1-chōme 7-20 ban, 2-chōme 1-8 and 17-ban, 3-chōme 1-17 and 29-42-ban, 4-chōme, 5-chōme 1-19 ban, and 6-chōme 1-11, 13-14, and 28-35-ban are zoned to Jingumae Elementary School (渋谷区立神宮前小学校). Jingūmae 1-chōme 1-6 and 21-24 ban, 2-chōme 9-16、18-35, and 3-chōme 18-28 ban are zoned to Sendagaya Elementary School (渋谷区立千駄谷小学校). Jingumae 5-chome 20-53 ban and 6-chome 12, and 15-27 ban are zoned to Jinnan Elementary School (神南小学校).

Jingūmae 1-4-chōme, 5-chōme 1-33 ban, and 6-chōme 1-17 and 24-35-ban are zoned to Harajuku Gaien Junior High School (原宿外苑中学校). 5-chōme 20-53 ban and
6-chōme 12 and 15-27 ban are zoned to Shoto Junior High School (渋谷区立松濤中学校).

Public elementary and junior high schools within Jingumae include:
 Harajuku-Gaien Junior High School (原宿外苑中学校) (Jingūmae 1-24-6)
 Jingumae Elementary School (渋谷区立神宮前小学校) (Jingūmae 4-20-12)

Tokyo Metropolitan Board of Education operates public high schools.

Prefectural high schools in Jingumae include:
  (東京都立青山高等学校) (Jingūmae 2-1-8)

Private high schools in Jingumae include:
  (國學院高等学校) (Jingūmae 2-2-3)

Libraries

  (渋谷区立中央図書館) (Jingūmae 1-4-1)

References

Neighborhoods of Tokyo
Districts of Shibuya